Speed is a town in Edgecombe County, North Carolina, United States. It is part of the Rocky Mount, North Carolina Metropolitan Statistical Area. The population was 80 at the 2010 census.  The town of Speed was founded by Andrew Jackson Parker Sr. It was named after the town doctor Eugene Travis Speed Sr.

Geography

Demographics

As of the census of 2000, there were 70 people, 28 households, and 15 families residing in the town. The population density was 247.3 people per square mile (96.5/km). There were 60 housing units at an average density of 212.0 per square mile (82.7/km). The racial makeup of the town was 51.43% White, 45.71% African American, 2.86% from other races. Hispanic or Latino of any race were 2.86% of the population.

There were 28 households, out of which 21.4% had children under the age of 18 living with them, 53.6% were married couples living together, and 42.9% were non-families. 42.9% of all households were made up of individuals, and 25.0% had someone living alone who was 65 years of age or older. The average household size was 2.50 and the average family size was 3.50.

In the town, the population was spread out, with 20.0% under the age of 18, 2.9% from 18 to 24, 25.7% from 25 to 44, 30.0% from 45 to 64, and 21.4% who were 65 years of age or older. The median age was 47 years. For every 100 females, there were 100.0 males. For every 100 females age 18 and over, there were 107.4 males.

The median income for a household in the town was $25,938, and the median income for a family was $46,875. Males had a median income of $33,333 versus $36,250 for females. The per capita income for the town was $17,079. There were 22.2% of families and 26.9% of the population living below the poverty line, including no under eighteens and 46.2% of those over 64.

References

Towns in Edgecombe County, North Carolina
Towns in North Carolina
Rocky Mount metropolitan area